Aghveran is a mountain resort in the Kotayk Province of Armenia, within the municipality of Arzakan village, located to the north of Buzhakan village. It is situated on the Hrazdan River's right-side tributary of Dalar.

Gallery

See also 
Kotayk Province

References

Mountain resorts in Armenia
Populated places in Kotayk Province